Lifestyle is the interests, opinions, behaviours, and behavioural orientations of an individual, group, or culture. The term was introduced by Austrian psychologist Alfred Adler in his 1929 book, The Case of Miss R., with the meaning of "a person's basic character as established early in childhood". The broader sense of lifestyle as a "way or style of living" has been documented since 1961. Lifestyle is a combination of determining intangible or tangible factors. Tangible factors relate specifically to demographic variables, i.e. an individual's demographic profile, whereas intangible factors concern the psychological aspects of an individual such as personal values, preferences, and outlooks.

A rural environment has different lifestyles compared to an urban metropolis. Location is important even within an urban scope. The nature of the neighborhood in which a person resides affects the set of lifestyles available to that person due to differences between various neighborhoods' degrees of affluence and proximity to natural and cultural environments. For example, in areas near the sea, a surf culture or lifestyle can often be present.

Individual identity
A lifestyle typically reflects an individual's attitudes, way of life, values, or world view. Therefore, a lifestyle is a means of forging a sense of self and to create cultural symbols that resonate with personal identity. Not all aspects of a lifestyle are voluntary. Surrounding social and technical systems can constrain the lifestyle choices available to the individual and the symbols they are able to project to others and themself.

The lines between personal identity and the everyday doings that signal a particular lifestyle become blurred in modern society. For example, "green lifestyle" means holding beliefs and engaging in activities that consume fewer resources and produce less harmful waste (i.e. a smaller ecological footprint), and deriving a sense of self from holding these beliefs and engaging in these activities. Some commentators argue that, in modernity, the cornerstone of lifestyle construction is consumption behavior, which offers the possibility to create and further individualize the self with different products or services that signal different ways of life.

Lifestyle may include views on politics, religion, health, intimacy, and more. All of these aspects play a role in shaping someone's lifestyle.

In the magazine and television industries, "lifestyle" is used to describe a category of publications or programs.

History of lifestyles studies

Three main phases can be identified in the history of lifestyles studies:

Lifestyles and social position
Earlier studies on lifestyles focus on the analysis of social structure and of the individuals' relative positions inside it. Thorstein Veblen, with his 'emulation' concept, opens this perspective by asserting that people adopt specific 'schemes of life', and in particular specific patterns of 'conspicuous consumption', depending on a desire for distinction from social strata they identify as inferior and a desire for emulation of the ones identified as superior. Max Weber intends lifestyles as distinctive elements of status groups strictly connected with a dialectic of recognition of prestige: the lifestyle is the most visible manifestation of social differentiation, even within the same social class, and in particular it shows the prestige which the individuals believe they enjoy or to which they aspire. Georg Simmel carries out formal analysis of lifestyles, at the heart of which can be found processes of individualisation, identification, differentiation, and recognition, understood both as generating processes of, and effects generated by, lifestyles, operating "vertically" as well as "horizontally". Finally, Pierre Bourdieu renews this approach within a more complex model in which lifestyles, made up mainly of social practices and closely tied to individual tastes, represent the basic point of intersection between the structure of the field and processes connected with the habitus.

Lifestyles as styles of thought
The approach interpreting lifestyles as principally styles of thought has its roots in the soil of psychological analysis. Initially, starting with Alfred Adler, a lifestyle was understood as a style of personality, in the sense that the framework of guiding values and principles which individuals develop in the first years of life end up defining a system of judgement which informs their actions throughout their lives. Later, particularly in Milton Rokeach's work, Arnold Mitchell's VALS research and Lynn R. Kahle's LOV research, lifestyles' analysis developed as profiles of values, reaching the hypothesis that it is possible to identify various models of scales of values organized hierarchically, to which different population sectors correspond. Then with Daniel Yankelovich and William Wells we move on to the so-called AIO approach in which attitudes, interests and opinions are considered as fundamental lifestyles' components, being analysed from both synchronic and diachronic points of view and interpreted on the basis of socio-cultural trends in a given social context (as, for instance, in Bernard Cathelat's work). Finally, a further development leads to the so-called profiles-and-trends approach, at the core of which is an analysis of the relations between mental and behavioural variables, bearing in mind that socio-cultural trends influence both the diffusion of various lifestyles within a population and the emerging of different modalities of interaction between thought and action.

Lifestyles as styles of action
Analysis of lifestyles as action profiles is characterized by the fact that it no longer considers the action level as a simple derivative of lifestyles, or at least as their collateral component, but rather as a constitutive element. In the beginning, this perspective focussed mainly on consumer behaviour, seeing products acquired as objects expressing on the material plane individuals’ self-image and how they view their position in society. Subsequently, the perspective broadened to focus more generally on the level of daily life, concentrating – as in authors such as Joffre Dumazedier and Anthony Giddens – on the use of time, especially loisirs, and trying to study the interaction between the active dimension of choice and the dimension of routine and structuration which characterize that level of action. Finally, some authors, for instance Richard Jenkins and A. J. Veal, suggested an approach to lifestyles in which it is not everyday actions which make up the plane of analysis but those which the actors who adopt them consider particularly meaningful and distinctive.

Health

A healthy or unhealthy lifestyle will most likely be transmitted across generations. According to the study done by Case et al. (2002), when a 0-3-year-old child has a mother who practices a healthy lifestyle, this child will be 27% more likely to become healthy and adopt the same lifestyle. For instance, high income parents are more likely to eat more fruit and vegetables, have time to exercise, and provide the best living condition to their children. On the other hand, low-income parents are more likely to participate in unhealthy activities such as smoking to help them release poverty-related stress and depression. Parents are the first teacher for every child. Everything that parents do will be very likely transferred to their children through the learning process.

Adults may be drawn together by mutual interest that results in a lifestyle. For example, William Dufty described how pursuing a sugar-free diet led to such associations:

Class
Lifestyle research can contribute to the question of the relevance of the class concept.

Media culture
The term lifestyle was introduced in the 1950s as a derivative of that of style in art:
 

Theodor W. Adorno noted that there is a "culture industry" in which the mass media is involved, but that the term "mass culture" is inappropriate:
 

The media culture of advanced capitalism typically creates new "life-styles" to drive the consumption of new commodities:

See also

 Aeromobility
 Alternative lifestyle
 Intentional living
 Life stance
 Lifestyle brand
 Lifestyle guru
 Otium
 Personal life
 Sustainable living
 Simple living
 Style of life
 Tao
 Anthropology

References

Notes

Bibliography 
Adorno, Th., "Culture Industry Reconsidered," in Adorno (1991).
Adorno, The Culture Industry - Selected essays on mass culture, Routledge, London, 1991.
Amaturo E., Palumbo M., Classi sociali. Stili di vita, coscienza e conflitto di classe. Problemi metodologici, Ecig, Genova, 1990.
Ansbacher H. L., Life style. A historical and systematic review, in “Journal of individual psychology”, 1967, vol. 23, n. 2, pp. 191–212.
Bell D., Hollows J., Historicizing lifestyle. Mediating taste, consumption and identity from the 1900s to 1970s, Asghate, Aldershot-Burlington, 2006.
Bénédicte Châtel (Auteur), Jean-Luc Dubois (Auteur), Bernard Perret (Auteur), Justice et Paix-France (Auteur), François Maupu (Postface), Notre mode de vie est-il durable ? : Nouvel horizon de la responsabilité, Karthala Éditions, 2005
Bernstein, J. M. (1991) "Introduction," in Adorno (1991)
Berzano L., Genova C., Lifestyles and Subcultures. History and a New Perspective, Routledge, London, 2015.
Burkle, F. M. (2004)
Calvi G. (a cura di), Indagine sociale italiana. Rapporto 1986, Franco Angeli, Milano, 1987.
Calvi G. (a cura di), Signori si cambia. Rapporto Eurisko sull’evoluzione dei consumi e degli stili di vita, Bridge, Milano, 1993.
Calvi G., Valori e stili di vita degli italiani, Isedi, Milano, 1977.
Cathelat B., Les styles de vie des Français 1978–1998, Stanké, Parigi, 1977.
Cathelat B., Socio-Styles-Système. Les “styles de vie”. Théorie, méthodes, applications, Les éditions d’organisation, Parigi, 1990.
Cathelat B., Styles de vie, Les éditions d’organisation, pàgiri, 1985.
Chaney D., Lifestyles, Routledge, Londra, 1996.
Fabris G., Mortara V., Le otto Italie. Dinamica e frammentazione della società italiana, Mondadori, Milano, 1986.
Faggiano M. P., Stile di vita e partecipazione sociale giovanile. Il circolo virtuoso teoria-ricerca-teoria, Franco Angeli, Milano, 2007.
Gonzalez Moro V., Los estilos de vida y la cultura cotidiana. Un modelo de investigacion, Baroja, [San Sebastian, 1990].
Kahle L., Attitude and social adaption. A person-situation interaction approach, Pergamon, Oxford, 1984.
Kahle L., Social values and social change. Adaptation to life in America, Praeger, Santa Barbara, 1983.
Leone S., Stili di vita. Un approccio multidimensionale, Aracne, Roma, 2005.
Mitchell A., Consumer values. A tipology, Values and lifestyles program, SRI International, Stanford, 1978.
Mitchell A., Life ways and life styles, Business intelligence program, SRI International, Stanford, 1973.
Mitchell A., The nine American lifestyles. Who we are and where we’re going, Macmillan, New York, 1983.
Mitchell A., Ways of life, Values and lifestyles program, SRI International, Stanford, 1982.
Negre Rigol P., El ocio y las edades. Estilo de vida y oferta lúdica, Hacer, Barcelona, 1993.
Parenti F., Pagani P. L., Lo stile di vita. Come imparare a conoscere sé stessi e gli altri, De Agostini, Novara, 1987.
Patterson M. Consumption and Everyday Life, 2006
Ragone G., Consumi e stili di vita in Italia, Guida, Napoli, 1985.
Ramos Soler I., El estilo de vida de los mayores y la publicidad, La Caixa, Barcelona, [2007].
Rokeach M., Beliefs, attitudes and values, Jossey-Bass, San Francisco, 1968.
Rokeach M., The nature of human values, Free Press, New York, 1973.
Shields R., Lifestyle shopping. The subject of consumption, Routledge, Londra, 1992.
Shulman B. H., Mosak H. H., Manual for life style assessment, Accelerated Development, Muncie, 1988 (trad. it. Manuale per l’analisi dello stile di vita, Franco Angeli, Milano, 2008).
Sobel M. E., Lifestyle and social structure. Concepts, definitions and analyses, Academic Press, New York, 1981.
Soldevilla Pérez C., Estilo de vida. Hacia una teoría psicosocial de la acción, Entimema, Madrid, 1998.
Valette-Florence P., Les styles de vie. Bilan critique et perspectives. Du mythe à la réalité, Nathan, Parigi, 1994.
Valette-Florence P., Les styles de vie. Fondements, méthodes et applications, Economica, Parigi, 1989.
Valette-Florence P., Jolibert A., Life-styles and consumption patterns, Publications de recherche du CERAG, École supériore des affaires de Grenoble, 1988.
Veal A. J., The concept of lifestyle. A review, in “Leisure studies”, 1993, vol. 12, n. 4, pp. 233–252.
Vergati S., Stili di vita e gruppi sociali, Euroma, Roma, 1996.
Walters G. D., Beyond behavior. Construction of an overarching psychological theory of lifestyles, Praeger, Westport, 2000.
Wells W. (a cura di), Life-style and psycographics, American marketing association, Chicago, 1974.
Yankelovich D., New criteria for market segmentation, in “Harvard Business Review”, 1964, vol. 42, n. 2, pp. 83–90.
Yankelovich D., Meer D., Rediscovering market segmentation, in “Harvard Business Review”, 2006, febbraio, pp. 1–10.

External links
 George Vrousgos, N.D. - Southern Cross University

 
1920s neologisms
Personal life
Philosophy of life
Culture
Sociological terminology
Subcultures